Hieronymus Francken may refer to one of the following three Flemish artists from the same family:

Hieronymus Francken I (ca. 1540–1610)
Hieronymus Francken II (1578-1623)
Hieronymus Francken III (1611– 1671)